The Ambitious Statesman; Or, The Loyal Favourite is a 1679 tragedy by the English writer John Crowne. It was originally staged by the King's Company at the Theatre Royal, Drury Lane in London. The original cast is unknown except for Joseph Haines who played La Marre, and also spoke the epilogue.

Characters
 Charles, King of France
 The Dauphin
 The Constable of France
 The Duke of Vendosme
 Count Brisas
 Count La Force
 La Marre
 Mademoiselle De Guise
 La Guard

References

Bibliography
 Jenkinson, Matthew. Culture and Politics at the Court of Charles II, 1660-1685. Boydell & Brewer, 2010.
 Van Lennep, W. The London Stage, 1660-1800: Volume One, 1660-1700. Southern Illinois University Press, 1960.
 White, Arthur Franklin. John Crowne: His Life and Dramatic Works. Routledge,  2019.

1679 plays
West End plays
Tragedy plays
Historical plays
Cultural depictions of French kings
Plays about French royalty
Plays based on real people
Plays by John Crowne
Plays set in France